Damien Farquet  (born 1971) is a Swiss ski mountaineer and cross-country skier. Professionally he is deployed in the Border Guard Corps and lives in Le Châble.

Selected results 
 1994:
 1st, Patrouille de la Maya A-course, together with Jean Moix and Michel Cheseaux
 2000:
 1st and course record, Tour de Matterhorn (together with Emanuel Buchs and Rico Elmer)
 2002:
 1st, Patrouille de la Maya A-course, together with Rico Elmer and Rolf Zurbrügg
 2003:
 1st, Trophée des Gastlosen, together with Rico Elmer
 1st, European Championship team race (together with Rico Elmer)
 5th, European Championship combination ranking
 6th Pierra Menta (together with Rico Elmer)
 10th, European Championship single race
 2004:
 3rd, Transcavallo race (together with Rico Elmer)

Patrouille des Glaciers 

 1996, 1st (international military teams ranking), together with Emanuel Buchs and André Rey
 1998: 1st, together with Pvt E-2 Emanuel Buchs and Pvt E-2 Rico Elmer
 2000: 1st and course record, together with Pvt E-2 Emanuel Buchs and Pvt E-2 Rico Elmer
 2004: 3rd, together with Rolf Zurbrügg and Rico Elmer

Trofeo Mezzalama 

 2001: 4th, together with Emanuel Buchs and Rico Elmer
 2003: 1st, together with Rolf Zurbrügg and Rico Elmer

External links

References 

1971 births
Living people
Swiss male ski mountaineers
Swiss military patrol (sport) runners
Swiss male cross-country skiers
People from Bagnes
Sportspeople from Valais